Help Me... I'm Possessed is a 1974 American horror film directed by Charles Nizet, written by Bill Greer and Deedy Peters, and starring Greer, Peters, Lynne Marta, and Dorothy Green.

Cast

Production
The film was shot in 1971 under the working title Nightmare at Blood Castle.

Release
In November 2021, the American Genre Film Archive (AGFA) released the film on Blu-ray in a triple-feature set along with Carnival of Blood (1970) and Night of the Strangler (1972).

References

External links

1974 films
American supernatural horror films
Films set in psychiatric hospitals
1974 horror films
1970s American films
1970s English-language films